Edgars Kukša (born 26 January 1990) is a Latvian handball player for OHV Aurich and the Latvian national team.

He represented Latvia at the 2020 European Men's Handball Championship.

References

1990 births
Living people
Latvian male handball players
Expatriate handball players
Latvian expatriate sportspeople in Germany